Agnes Helen Armstrong (born 10 June 1959) is a Cook Islands politician and member of the Cook Islands Parliament.  She is a member of the Cook Islands Democratic Party.

Armstrong is from Rarotonga and was educated at Nikao Side School and Tereora College. She worked as a seafood retailer, shipping agent, and for Air New Zealand. She moved to Mangaia in 2016 to start an orchard. Her husband contested the 2017 Ivirua by-election following the retirement of Jim Marurai and was elected to Parliament. Following his death in 2018 she contested the resulting 2019 Ivirua by-election and was elected in his place. Shortly after the election, she attended the UNDP's Pacific Women in Power Forum with other female Cook Island's MP's.

In December 2019 she was part of a protest by women MPs to permit the wearing of ei katu (floral crowns) in Parliament. In February 2020 she was appointed spokesperson for Internal Affairs, and Outer Islands Special Projects. In April 2020 Armstrong voluntarily took a 15% pay cut to help her constituents during the COVID-19 pandemic. In June of that year she advocated for tariffs on imported fruit and vegetables to encourage local production.

She was re-elected at the 2022 Cook Islands general election.

References

Living people
1959 births
People from Rarotonga
Members of the Parliament of the Cook Islands
Democratic Party (Cook Islands) politicians
Cook Island women in politics